Mesogobio tumenensis is a species of freshwater fish in the family Cyprinidae. It is endemic to the Tumen River in China.

References

 

Mesogobio
Fish described in 1980